Edmée Abetel-Barré (26 November 1922 – 14 April 2002) was a Swiss alpine skier. She competed in the 1952 Winter Olympics.

References

1922 births
2002 deaths
Alpine skiers at the 1952 Winter Olympics
Swiss female alpine skiers
Olympic alpine skiers of Switzerland
Sportspeople from Lausanne
20th-century Swiss women